Oecomys flavicans, also known as the tawny oecomys or yellow arboreal rice rat, is a species of rodent in the genus Oecomys of family Cricetidae. It is found in the mountains of northwestern Venezuela and nearby Colombia.

References

Literature cited
Gómez-Laverde, M. and Rivas, B. 2008. . In IUCN. IUCN Red List of Threatened Species. Version 2009.2. <www.iucnredlist.org>. Downloaded on November 30, 2009.
Musser, G.G. and Carleton, M.D. 2005. Superfamily Muroidea. Pp. 894–1531 in Wilson, D.E. and Reeder, D.M. (eds.). Mammal Species of the World: a taxonomic and geographic reference. 3rd ed. Baltimore: The Johns Hopkins University Press, 2 vols., 2142 pp. 

Mammals of Colombia
Mammals of Venezuela
Oecomys
Mammals described in 1894
Taxa named by Oldfield Thomas
Taxonomy articles created by Polbot